Chintang (Chintang: छिन्ताङ् Chintāṅ / Chhintang) is an eastern Kirati languages language spoken by 5,000 to 6,000 people in Chhintang VDC and Ahale VDC in Dhankuta District, Province No. 1, Nepal. The language has two dialects, Mulgaun and Sambhugaon. Most speakers of Chintang are also fluent speakers of the Indo-European Nepali language, which is the lingua franca of Nepal and the sole language of instruction in school, and the Sino-Tibetan Bantawa language, which is closely related to Chintang. The UNESCO World Atlas of Languages classifies the language as definitely endangered.

References

Bibliography
Bickel, Balthasar, G. Banjade, M. Gaenszle, E. Lieven, N. P. Paudyal (2007). Free prefix ordering in Chintang. Language, 83 (1), 43–73.

External links
The Chintang and Puma Documentation Project (DoBeS)
The Chintang Language Research Project (CLRP)

Kiranti languages
Languages of Nepal
Languages of Koshi Province